Neo Geo is a 1987 album by Ryuichi Sakamoto. The term "neo geo", or "new world", is derived from Sakamoto himself as a way to describe worldwide musical diversity in regard to genre (similar to world music and world beat).

The track "Risky" featuring Iggy Pop on vocals was released as a single with another track from Neo Geo "After All" as the B-side. The music video for "Risky" was directed by Meiert Avis and was released in two different versions to accompany the 7" and 12" extended version of the song. The latter contains scenes of female nudity.

Track listing

Personnel
Performers
Ryuichi Sakamoto – keyboard, piano, computer
Yukio Tsuji – shakuhachi, gayageum
Iggy Pop – vocals (3)
Kazumi Tamaki – vocals
Misako Koja – vocals
Yoriko Ganeko – vocals
Bill Laswell – bass
David Van Tieghem – percussions
Bootsy Collins – bass
Emmett Chapman – Chapman stick
Tony Williams – drums
Sly Dunbar – drums
Eddie Martinez – guitar
Haruo Kubota – guitar
Lucia Hwong – pipa

Technical
Jason Corsaro – mixing
Clive Smith – programmer
Jeff Bova – programmer

Charts

References

1987 albums
Ryuichi Sakamoto albums
Albums produced by Bill Laswell
Albums produced by Ryuichi Sakamoto